Paul Ayongo (born 16 November 1996) is a Ghanaian professional footballer who plays as a forward for Central Coast Mariners.

Professional career
Ayongo made his professional debut with Paços de Ferreira in a 3–2 Taça da Liga win over Académico de Viseu on 28 July 2018.

References

External links
 
 Paul Ayongo at ZeroZero

1996 births
Living people
Ghanaian footballers
Charity Stars F.C. players
AD Oeiras players
Amarante F.C. players
F.C. Paços de Ferreira players
C.D. Mafra players
Académico de Viseu F.C. players
Central Coast Mariners FC players
Liga Portugal 2 players
Association football forwards
Ghanaian expatriate footballers
Ghanaian expatriate sportspeople in Portugal
Expatriate footballers in Portugal